Opsilia varentzovi is a species of beetle from the family Cerambycidae found in Caucassus, Iran, and South Caucasus.

References

Beetles described in 1896
Beetles of Asia
varentzovi
Taxa named by Andrey Semyonov-Tyan-Shansky